UF is abbreviation for the University of Florida.

UF may also refer to

Arts and entertainment
Ultimate Force, a British television drama series
User Friendly, a webcomic

Businesses and organisations
UM Airlines (IATA airline designation UF)
University of Findlay
Florida Museum of Natural History, by collection code
United Front (East Pakistan), a former coalition of political parties in East Pakistan
United Front (India), a coalition of political parties forming the government of India after the 1996 general election
United Front (Sri Lanka), a former coalition of political parties in Sri Lanka
Uppsala Association of International Affairs (Utrikespolitiska föreningen), a Swedish organization providing balanced debate around international issues

Science and technology
Microformat, a web-based approach to semantic markup
Ultrafiltration, an industrial filtration technique
Uncinate fasciculus, a region of the human brain
Urea-formaldehyde, a synthetic resin
Underground feeder, a type of electrical cable

Other uses
Unidad de Fomento, unit of account used in Chile
Union des Francophones, a Belgian electoral list
United front, a form of struggle by revolutionaries

See also
Microfarad (μF), a unit of electrical capacitance equal to 1 × 10−6 farads